Kolleru Lake is one of the largest  freshwater lakes in India located in state of Andhra Pradesh and forms the largest shallow freshwater lake in Asia (with 245 km2 of lake area and 302 km2 of total Ramsar designated wetland), 15 kilometers away from the Eluru and 65 km from Rajamahendravaram, it is located between Krishna and Godavari deltas. Kolleru Lake is located in Eluru district. The lake is fed directly by water from the seasonal Budameru and Tammileru streams, and is connected to the Krishna and Godavari irrigation systems by over 67 major and minor irrigation canals. This lake is a major tourist attraction. Many birds migrate here in winter, such as Siberian crane, ibis, and painted storks. The lake was an important habitat for an estimated 20 million resident and migratory birds, including the grey or spot-billed pelican (Pelecanus philippensis). The lake was declared as a wildlife sanctuary in November 1999 under India's Wildlife Protection Act of 1972, and designated a wetland of international importance in November 2002 under the international Ramsar Convention. The wildlife sanctuary covers an area of 308 km2.

Current state of the lake 

Thousands of fish tanks were dug up, effectively converting the lake into a mere drain. This has great impact in terms of pollution, leading to difficulty in getting drinking water for the local people. This is in addition to the loss of ecological diversity and intrusion of sea water into the land masses and its fallout in terms of adverse influence on the rainfall pattern in this region. This imbalance has an adverse effect on the thousands of acres of crops in the upper reaches of the sanctuary, in view of the stoppage of water flow into the sea because of obstruction by the bunds of the fish tanks that have appeared illegally.

Satellite images taken on 9 February 2001 by the Indian remote sensing satellite found that approximately 42% of the 245 km2 lake was occupied by aquaculture, while agriculture had encroached upon another 8.5%. The area under aquaculture consisted of 1,050 fish ponds within the lake and 38 dried-up fish ponds, which together covered an area of 103 km2. The agricultural encroachments were mostly rice paddies. Surprisingly, no clear water could be found in the satellite image. The rest of the lake is diminished by water diversion or is infested with weeds like elephant grass and the water hyacinth.

Rich in flora and fauna, the lake had always attracted migratory birds from Northern Asia and Eastern Europe, between the months of October and March. During this season, the lake used to be visited by an estimated two million birds.

The resident birds include:
 grey pelicans,
 Asian open-bill (Anastomus oscitans),
 painted storks (Mycteria leucocephala),
 glossy ibises and
 white ibises.

The migratory birds include:
 red-crested pochards,
 black-winged stilts,
 pied avocets,
 common redshanks,
 Eurasian wigeons,
 gadwalls,
 great cormorants,
 garganeys,
 purple herons,
 greater flamingos,
 green-winged teals,
 northern pintails and
 northern shovelers.

Kolleru lake contains numerous fertile islets called lankas; many of the small ones are submerged during floods. The origin of the unusual depression which forms the bed of the lake is unknown, but it was possibly the result of an earthquake. Therefore, many ancient villages are precepted in the bed of the lake as a result of floods and earthquake. building the industries and factories near the lake that why the lake is polluting and the government also declared the operation kolleru.

History 

Two copper plates have been found in the lake, tracing its history to reign of the Eastern Ganga rulers. The Suryavamsi Gajapatis of Odisha at the height of their power in the 15th century under the reign of Kapilendra deva, the first Suryavamsi Gajapati emperor, the boundary of the Kalinga empire (Ancient Odisha) stretched from river Ganges in North to Kaveri in South and from Amarkantak in West to Bay of Bengal(Kalinga Sagara) in east.Peddintlamma Temple, Kolletikota

Sanctuary

The sanctuary has the following watch towers for sighting the birds.

Atapaka: 1.5 km from Kaikaluru to see varieties of waterfowl.
Murthyraju tank 8 km from Nidamarru
East Chodavaram: 25 km from Eluru where openbill storks nest in colonies from July to December.

The sanctuary is approachable from all four sides of the lake by road, directly to the following places:
 Atapaka – 2.5 km from Kaikaluru town
 Bhujabalapatnam – 6 km from Kaikaluru 
pallevada −9  km from kaikaluru town
 Kovvada Lanka—7 km from Kaikaluru town *Murthiraju Tanks – 8 km from Nidamarru
Gudivakalanka – 3 km from Gudivakalanka or 15 km from Eluru, The nearest city by road or rail.
Prathikola Lanaka or 19 km from Eluru. The nearest city is Eluru, which is 35 km by road.
 Kolletikota −18 km from Kaikalur.

Accommodation
Hotels are available in Eluru, Bhimavaram, Narsapur, Palakollu, Kaikaluru, Akividu, Rajamahendravaram, Vijayawada and Machilipatnam.

References

History of Kolleru: The Imperial Gazetteer of India By Sir William Wilson Hunter, volume ix

External links

https://web.archive.org/web/20060824182531/http://www.aptourism.com/apservlets/jsp/iplaces3.jsp?&THEME=Wild+Life&LOCATION=Kolleru&DISTRICT=West+Godavari&infoId=217

Eastern Highlands moist deciduous forests
Central Deccan Plateau dry deciduous forests
Lakes of Andhra Pradesh
Ramsar sites in India
Important Bird Areas of India
Tourist attractions in Eluru
Geography of West Godavari district